The EFLU Hyderabad well (also known as Maha Laqa Chanda Bai's well) is a cultural heritage of English and Foreign Languages University (EFLU) in Hyderabad, Telangana in India. It was built during the Asaf Jahi period and is around 200 years old. It is a large stepped well and the geometrical design is distinct amidst a variety of historical architecture from the Nizam period. It is a three-storeyed structure which has five flight of steps, two on each storey and one that leads to the water. This well is in the shape of a square with four arches on each floor and is also a square on plan at the bottom.

The heritage well was enlisted in the state heritage list by the Hyderabad Metropolitan Development Corporation (HMDC) and Municipal Corporation (MC) in January, 2013. The EFLU Heritage Well Conservation Committee from EFLU Hyderabad is the responsible body for planning, conserving and promoting this cultural heritage. In 2013 students petitioned the country's President to call for the well to be preserved.

References

External links
https://www.facebook.com/pages/EFLU-Heritage-Well-Conservation-Committee/525579644146683?ref=stream#

Buildings and structures in Hyderabad, India
Stepwells in Hyderabad
Water wells in India